The Grey Area is a studio album by American hip hop artist Onry Ozzborn, a member of the Pacific Northwest hip hop collective Oldominion. It was released June 17, 2003 on One Drop Records. Guest appearances include Sleep, Qwazaar and Luckyiam of Living Legends, among others.

Music 
The album is produced by Mr. Hill, Onry Ozzborn, Smoke M2D6, Pale Soul and Peegee 13. It also features recording artists Barfly, Bishop I, Gash, JFK Ninjaface, Karim, Luckyiam, Pale Soul, Peegee 13, Qwaazar, Qwel, Sleep and Vance Snow.

Track listing

References

External links 
 The Grey Area at Discogs

2003 albums
Hip hop albums by American artists
Pacific Northwest hip hop albums